was a Japanese professional shogi player and president of Japan Shogi Association  (May, 2005 - December 18, 2012).
He received an honorary title Lifetime Kisei due to his remarkable results in the Kisei title tournament. He is a former Meijin and 10-dan.

Biography 
Yonenaga was born in Masuho, Yamanashi in 1943. He became a disciple of shogi professional Yūji Sase and moved to Tokyo to live with his teacher to become a professional.  

Yonenaga became a professional in 1963, and was promoted to 9 dan in 1979. 
 
Yonenaga was regarded as one of the best shogi players through the 1970s and 1980s. He won Kisei, his first titleholder championship in 1973 and dominated four of the seven shogi titles in 1984. He was awarded as Best Shogi Player of the Year thrice (1978, 1983 and 1984), though he had not won a Meijin title, then regarded the supreme tournament, for decades. He finally won Meijin in 1993 when he was 49 (the oldest on record), but he was defeated by Yoshiharu Habu the next year. Yonenaga retired in 2003.

He was also an education board member for Tokyo.

In 2008 Yonenaga announced he had suffered cancer since 2008 spring. He reported his cancer diagnosis on his website occasionally which later turned into a book Cancer Note (published in 2009).  

Yonenaga was one of early shogi professionals who played with computer shogi publicly. Yonenaga authored his last book I lost about this game.

Yonenaga died on December 18 2012 from prostate cancer at a hospital in Tokyo.

Titles and other championships

Honours 
Medal with Purple Ribbon (2003)
Order of the Rising Sun, 4th Class, Gold Rays with Rosette (2013)

References

External links

 YouTube: Interview with Kunio Yonenaga

Japanese shogi players
Recipients of the Order of the Rising Sun, 4th class
Recipients of the Medal with Purple Ribbon
Professional shogi players from Yamanashi Prefecture
1943 births
2012 deaths
Deceased professional shogi players
Meijin (shogi)
Tenth Dan
Kisei (shogi)
Ōi (shogi)
Kiō
Ōshō
Lifetime titles
Recipients of the Kōzō Masuda Award
Presidents of the Japan Shogi Association